Taner Öner (born March 4, 1971) is a Turkish football manager. Currently, he serves as the manager of the Istanbul-based Ataşehir Belediyespor in the Turkish Women's First Football League.

Taner Öner was born in Erzincan, Turkey on March 4, 1971.

His team Ataşehir Belediyespor finished the 2016–17 Turkish Women's First League season after the play-offs at third place. In the 2017–18 season, he enjoyed league championship with his team.

Managerial statistics

Honours
Turkish Women's First Football League
 Ataşehir Belediyespor
 Winners (1): 2017–18
 Third places (1): 2016–17

References

Living people
1971 births
People from Erzincan
Turkish women's football managers
Ataşehir Belediyespor managers